Battle of Rastan may refer to:

 Battle of Rastan (2011)
 Battle of Rastan (2012)
 May 2012 battle of Rastan

See also
 Siege of Rastan and Talbiseh